Chenarli (also Romanized as Chenārlī) is a village in Maraveh Tappeh Rural District, in the Central District of Maraveh Tappeh County, Golestan Province, Iran. At the 2006 census, its population was 568, in 105 families.
People: Turkmen. They migrated from Turkmenistan since Soviet Union were governing Turkmenistan and killing Muslims.

References 

Populated places in Maraveh Tappeh County